This article lists the confirmed national futsal squads for the UEFA Futsal Euro 2014 tournament held in Belgium, between January 28 and February 8, 2014.

Group A

Head coach: Alain Dopchie

Head coach: Nelu Stancea

Head coach: Yevgen Ryvkin

Group B

Head coach: Marcel Loosveld

Head coach: Jorge Braz

Head coach: Sergei Skorovich

Group C

Head coach: Alesio Da Silva

Head coach: Roberto Menichelli

Head coach: Andrej Dobovičnik

Group D

Head coach: Mato Stanković

Head coach: Tomáš Neumann

Head coach: José Venancio López Hierro

External links
UEFA.com

UEFA Futsal Championship squads
Squads